Puerto Rico Highway 131 (PR-131) is a road located in Adjuntas, Puerto Rico. It begins at its intersection with PR-135 in Barrio Yayales and ends at Guilarte Forest near Peñuelas municipal limit. Its segment between PR-525 and PR-518 is part of the Ruta Panorámica.

Major intersections

Related route

Puerto Rico Highway 3131 (PR-3131) is a rural road that branches off from PR-132 in eastern Guayanilla and ends near Sector Malpaso in Peñuelas.

See also

 List of highways numbered 131

References

External links

 PR-131, Adjuntas, Puerto Rico

131
Adjuntas, Puerto Rico